Port Elphinstone railway station was a freight depot in Port Elphinstone, Aberdeenshire.

References

Notes

Sources
 
 
 RAILSCOT on Great North of Scotland Railway

Disused railway stations in Aberdeenshire